Bunheads  is an American comedy-drama television series created by Amy Sherman-Palladino and Lamar Damon that aired on ABC Family from June 11, 2012, to February 25, 2013. Starring Sutton Foster, the show centers on a Las Vegas showgirl who gets married on a whim and winds up teaching alongside her new mother-in-law at her ballet school. On July 22, 2013, ABC Family canceled the series after one season.

Premise
Bunheads is the tale of Michelle Simms, a former 'bunhead' (slang for ballerina) who wound up as a Las Vegas showgirl. Seeing her life and career at a dead end, she impulsively takes up the offer of marriage from her persistent admirer, Hubbell Flowers (Alan Ruck), and moves to his sleepy coastal town, the fictional town of Paradise, California, halfway between Ojai and Oxnard. Once there, Hubbell is killed in a car accident and Michelle struggles to adjust to life in a small town and teaching alongside her mother-in-law, Fanny Flowers (Kelly Bishop), at her ballet school, Paradise Dance Academy.

Cast and characters

Main

 Sutton Foster as Michelle Simms Flowers: A Las Vegas chorus girl who reluctantly marries kindly Hubbell Flowers to escape her life. Soon, though, she realizes that he is actually a good person and begins to enjoy her new life until the latter's death.
 Kelly Bishop as Fanny Flowers
 Kaitlyn Jenkins as Bettina "Boo" Jordan 
 Julia Goldani Telles as Sasha Torres
 Bailey Buntain as Virginia "Ginny" Thompson
 Emma Dumont as Melanie "Mel" Segal

Recurring
 Stacey Oristano as Truly Stone
 Liza Weil as Millicent "Milly" Stone
 Gregg Henry as Rico
 Dendrie Taylor as Nina
 Moises Parra as Moises 
 Rose Abdoo as Sam
 Julie Claire as Anastasia Torres
 Ellen Greene as Fanny's Friend
 RaJahnae Patterson as RaJahnae
 Casey J. Adler as Carl Cramer
 Paul James Jordan as Dez
 Zak Henri as Charlie Segal
 Matisse Love as Matisse
 Richard Gant as Michael
 Angelina McCoy as Talia
 Jennifer Hasty as Nanette
 Brad Ellis as Brad
 Alan Ruck as Hubbell Flowers
 Nathan Parsons as Godot
 Garrett Coffey as Roman
 Hunter Foster as Scotty Simms
 Jeanine Mason as Cozette
 Niko Pepaj as Frankie
 Kent Boyd as Jordan
 Victoria Park as Aubrey
 Gabriel Notarangelo as Josh
 Kiersten Warren as Claire Thompson
 Jayden Maddux as Dougie

Cameos
In addition to recurring actors that carried over from Gilmore Girls, including Kelly Bishop, Liza Weil, Gregg Henry, and Rose Abdoo, numerous other known actors, as well as Broadway actors, also appeared in episodes of Bunheads.

 Alex Borstein, who played Drella the harpist and Miss Celine, as Michelle's landlord in episode 1 and as Carl's Mother in episode 12.
 Alex Ko, who played Alex, a dancer in episode 3.
 Michael DeLuise, who played "TJ", as the magician "Jo Jo Deline" in episode 11.
 Sean Gunn, who played Kirk Gleason, as the over-zealous barista Bash in episodes 9 and 17.
 Chris Eigeman, who played Jason Stiles, as actor/director Conor in episode 8.
 Todd Lowe, who played Zach van Gerbig, as the one-eyed plumber Davis in episode 7.
 Biff Yeager, who played Tom the contractor, as Bob the hardware store owner in episodes 4 and 15.
 Linda Porter, who played Fran Westin, as Sasha's neighbor Mrs. Weidemeyer in episode 15.
 Jon Polito, who played Pete, owner of Pete's Pizza, as Sal Russano in episodes 5, 9, and 16.
 Kalani Hilliker, who played a dancer

Episodes
{{Episode table |background=#6E5240 |overall= |title= |director= |writer= |airdate= |viewers= |country=US |episodes=

{{Episode list
| EpisodeNumber   = 10
| Title           = A Nutcracker in Paradise
| DirectedBy      = Amy Sherman-Palladino
| WrittenBy       = Amy Sherman-Palladino
| OriginalAirDate = 
| Viewers         =1.50
| ShortSummary    = Sasha decides to rejoin Paradise Dance Academy in time for their famous productions of The Nutcracker reprising her usual role as "Clara," the lead. Before Fanny knew Sasha was back, she hired a professional dancer from San Francisco, "The Ringer," to play "Clara." This creates hostility between the two lead dancers. Michelle helps Ginny, Melanie, and Boo make up from their argument. Boo is still pining for Carl, and Sasha meets a boy from the basketball team when she was a cheerleader. Bad luck ensues the night of ''The Nutcrackers first show, starting with Fanny's 30-year-long relationship with Michael and ending with an accident backstage - Michelle macing all of the dancers - having almost everyone end up in the hospital. After a dream in which Hubbell informs her that she was meant to shake things up in Paradise, Michelle decides to leave Paradise. When leaving the hospital all the kids stand on chairs and say "O Captain! My Captain!"
| LineColor       = 6E5240 
}}

}}

Production

 Development 
Bunheads first appeared on the development slate at ABC Family in September 2010, under the title Strut, when the show received a cast-contingent pilot order. Lamar Damon wrote the script, and production was originally expected to begin in fall 2010. In September 2011, it was reported that the series was being retooled by Amy Sherman-Palladino, who would serve as executive producer. Originally ABC had been looking for their own answer to the musical series Glee but Palladino suggested going in another direction and doing a series in the world of ballet. The series was given a pilot order under the new name Bunheads.

 Casting 
On September 28, 2011, it was announced that Broadway star Sutton Foster was set to star in the lead role as Michelle. On February 11, 2012, ABC Family ordered the pilot to series with a ten episode order. Following shortly, on February 15, 2012, it was announced that Kelly Bishop would join the show playing the recurring role of Fanny Flowers, the mother-in-law to Michelle.

 Filming 
Filming took place in November with creator Amy Sherman-Palladino writing and directing. 

 Music 
It was announced on June 9, 2012, that singer-songwriter and Gilmore Girls composer Sam Phillips would score the music to Bunheads. 

 Renewals 
On August 17, 2012, Bunheads received a renewal for the "back end" of the first season (eight additional episodes). Bunheads returned on January 7, 2013, after Switched at Birth. On June 4, 2013, it was announced that Bunheads was one of 31 selected productions to receive California's Film and Television Tax Credit. Earning $5.82 million, the money would help fund a second season should the show be renewed. On July 4, 2013, it was announced that the sets were torn down, leading some reporters to speculate that the show would be canceled. ABC Family later confirmed that it was officially cancelled on July 22, 2013.

Reception

 Critical response 
Critics gave a very positive reception to the show, specifically praising Amy Sherman-Palladino's distinct writing and the performances of leading ladies Sutton Foster and Kelly Bishop. Robert Lloyd of Los Angeles Times thought "ABC Family's Bunheads a cute summer treat. Amy Sherman-Palladino strikes again with that Gilmore Girls charm in Bunheads, with Tony-winning Sutton Foster as a former showgirl mentoring budding ballerinas." Varietys Geoff Berkshire said "Sherman-Palladino's snappy banter and slightly melancholic characters only enrich the texture of a series perfectly pitched between comedy and drama." The Huffington Posts Maureen Ryan recommended the show saying "the pilot for Bunheads moves at a brisk, refreshing clip and it even packs an emotional wallop or two. The relationships that are sketched out in the first hour are promising. Sherman-Palladino has long been interested in characters who are dancing as fast as they can, and in this show, she has a whole new set to play with." Vanity Fairs James Wolcott titled the show a "knockout charmer" and singled out particular praise for lead Sutton Foster "revealing a knowing Carol Burnett-ish clowning flair that works beautifully on camera."

Newsday critic Diane Werts noted that "Bunheads set [a] multigenerational tone," and praised Sherman-Palladino's style. "Think they've all got a way with words? Some attitude? Smart pop-culture shout-outs? You betcha. Bunheads is from Gilmore Girls auteur Amy Sherman-Palladino, so it chatters just as giddily, from Gadhafi to Godzilla to Graceland." HitFix's Alan Sepinwall called "ABC Family's Bunheads a return to form for Amy Sherman-Palladino." and Times James Poniewozik, though showing some minor concern for the series plot going forward, suggested, "What matters is its voice, and the spring in its step, and its first hour was just so damn enjoyable that I'll gladly season-pass this and see where the season takes it. Out of the gate, Bunheads had some impressive moves; I look forward to trying to keep up." Ken Tucker of Entertainment Weekly said in his review of the pilot, "Summer TV just got dreamier, dancier...Sherman-Palladino has constructed Bunheads cannily to both fit into and transcend ABC Family's programming." On the mixed front, David Wiegand of the San Francisco Chronicle thought Bunheads "will take some work and it could just as easily become either annoying or likable."

Popular entertainment website The A.V. Club ranked Bunheads number 15 on their annual "The Best TV of 2012" list writing "At its best, Bunheads scavenges real heart out of its flea-market approach to plot and character. When Foster breathes “The re-usable tote!” and Kelly Bishop replies with satisfaction, “The re-usable tote,” it's time to be thankful Sherman-Palladino is back in business." The New Yorker's Emily Nussbaum included Bunheads among her favorite television shows of 2012, listing the Istanbul (Not Constantinople) dance number closing episode six as the year's most memorable TV moment, saying: "1. This. Television is always the best when it takes you by surprise. Following the season one finale, TIME's James Poniewozik wrote a piece on the show titled "On the Importance of Bunheads." In it he details Bunheads as a necessity in the TV landscape. "Over its first season, it’s been a joy to watch, funny, charming and bittersweet, and that’s reason enough for me to want it to stay on the air, despite not-great-even-for-ABC-Family ratings. But TV also needs this show to stay on the air, to prove that there are different kinds of stories worth telling outside the usual genres."

Alyssa Rosenberg of ThinkProgress asked "ABC Family, Save Bunheads!" She wrote: "All of this would be enough to make a specific, brilliant, rare show. But Bunheads is something more. Its characters have pop culture addictions that rival Community‘s. It’s the unusual show about women that has good male characters—Carl, Michelle’s maybe-boyfriend bartender Godot, Michelle’s hilariously shiftless brother—but that hasn’t subverted its female characters to their development, creating an unusual degree of gender balance. And it’s a show that’s not afraid of real sadness, but that doesn’t need to beat up on its characters to let them fail: when Michelle accidentally pepper-sprayed her students on the eve of a critically important performance for the school’s financial health, we were allowed to feel the weight of her accumulated past missteps without being disgusted by or feeling distanced from her. That’s a deft balance. And if ABC Family wants to level up on its brand, to be something more than the network where Shailene Woodley worked before she got famous, it should keep it up, and renew Bunheads." Slate magazine's David Weigel explained "Why Bunheads is the best show on TV." In his article, he wrote: "The New York Times has said it on the front page of the Style section, and regular Slate-ster Alyssa Rosenberg has said it eloquently at ThinkProgress. I’ll add my voice: ABC Family needs to renew Amy Sherman-Palladino’s fantastic ballet dramedy Bunheads, the best original, scripted show on TV."

Nearing a decision regarding renewal, on July 17, 2013, several critics dedicated individual articles urging ABC Family to renew Bunheads. Emily St. James of the AV Club wrote an article titled: "Hey, ABC Family: Just renew Bunheads already". In the article she wrote "Fortunately, the qualitative argument is very easy to make for Bunheads. It’s by several orders of magnitude the best show ABC Family has ever aired, and it’s not like that’s an easy task or anything." On Rotten Tomatoes season 1 has an approval rating of 100% based on reviews from 26 critics. On Metacritic season 1 has a score of 74 out of 100 based on reviews from 24 critics.

 Awards and nominations 
 2012 Teen Choice Award for Choice Breakout Star for Sutton Foster (nominated)
 2013 Thalo's Critics' Choice Inspiration Award for Bunheads (won) 2013 Dorian Award for Unsung TV Show of the Year for Bunheads (nominated)
 2013 Critics' Choice Television Award for Best Actress in a Comedy Series for Sutton Foster (nominated)
 2013 TCA Award for Outstanding Achievement in Youth Programming for Bunheads (won) 2013 Gracie Award for Outstanding Female Actor in a Breakthrough Role for Sutton Foster (won)'''

References

External links

 
 Interview with Sutton Foster: From Broadway to "Bunheads"
 Bunheads Music from Season One

2010s American comedy-drama television series
2010s American teen drama television series
2012 American television series debuts
2013 American television series endings
ABC Family original programming
Dance television shows
English-language television shows
Television series about ballet
Television shows set in Ventura County, California
Television series by Disney–ABC Domestic Television
Television series created by Amy Sherman-Palladino